The 1912 Svenska Mästerskapet was the 17th season of Svenska Mästerskapet, the football cup to determine the Swedish champions. Djurgårdens IF won the tournament by defeating Örgryte IS in the final with a 3–1 score.

Qualifying rounds

First qualifying round

|}

Second qualifying round

|-
|colspan=3 align=center|Replays

|}

Main tournament

Preliminary round

|-
|colspan=3 align=center|Replays

|}

Quarter-finals

|}

Semi-finals

|}

Final

Notes

References 

Print

http://eu-football.info/_tournament.php?id=3671

1912
Svenska
1912–13 in Swedish football